This page lists some of the notable clans within the Nepali political arena and their notable members and relatives. This list does not include all family members.

Thapa Family (Bhimsen Thapa)

Two families of Bagale Thapa clan were influential. One was the Birbhadra or Bhimsen family and other was Badakaji Amar Singh Thapa's family.

 Virbhadra Thapa (Kaji)
 Jeevan Thapa 
 Bangsha Raj Thapa 
 Amar Singh Thapa (born 1759) (Sanukaji)
 Bhimsen Thapa (Mukhtiyar)
Nain Singh Thapa (General Kaji)
 Ganesh Kumari Kunwar
Queen Tripurasundari of Nepal
Ujir Singh Thapa (Colonel Kaji)
Mathabar Singh Thapa (PM C-in-C)
Bhaktabar Singh Thapa (Colonel Kaji)
 Amrit Singh Thapa (Colonel Kaji)
Ranabir Singh Thapa (General Kaji)

Other notable connected members

Jung Bahadur Rana, Bam Bahadur Kunwar, Ranodip Singh Kunwar and their 4 other brothers, were grandson of Kaji Nain Singh through his daughter Ganesh Kumari.
Ranajit Pande, maternal grandfather of Ganesh Kumari, mother of Jung Bahadur Rana

Pande Family

 Ganesh Pandey (Kaji of Gorkha)
 Kalu Pande (Kaji of Gorkha), descendant of Ganesh Pande
 Bamsa Raj Pandey (Dewankaji)
 Damodar Pande (Mulkaji)
 Rana Jang Pande (Mukhtiyar)
Bhim Bahadur Pande, seventh descendant of Kalu Pande 
Prithvi Bahadur Pande, son of Bhim Bahadur
 Tularam Pande (Kaji), descendant of Ganesh Pande
 Ranajit Pande (Mulkaji), son of Tularam Pande
Dalbhanjan Pande, (Kaji), grandson of Tularam Pande
Other notable connected members

Kehar Singh Basnyat was Kalu Pande's son-in-law. 
 Kirtiman Singh Basnyat and Bakhtawar Singh Basnyat were grandsons of Kaji Kalu Pande through his daughter Chitra Devi.
 Nain Singh Thapa, son-in-law of Ranajit Pande.

Basnyat Family

Shreepali clan of Basnet were influential in the 18th-19th century.

 Shivaram Singh Basnyat (Senapati Badabir)
 Naahar Singh Basnyat (Kaji)
 Kehar Singh Basnyat (Kaji) 
 Kirtiman Singh Basnyat (Mulkaji)
 Bakhtawar Singh Basnyat (Mulkaji)
 Abhiman Singh Basnyat (Mulkaji)
 Dhokal Singh Basnyat (Governor)

Other notable connected members

Kalu Pande was father-in-law of Kehar Singh Basnyat.

Kunwar family

Ahirama Kunwar
Sardar Ramakrishna Kunwar of Gorkha Kingdom
Kaji Ranajit Kunwar of Gorkha Kingdom
Kaji Bal Narsingh Kunwar
Kaji Balaram Kunwar
Kaji Rewanta Bahadur Kunwar
Jaya Krishna Kunwar
Sardar Chandrabir Kunwar 
 Birbhadra Kunwar 
Captain Balbhadra Kunwar of Nalapani

Thapa family (Amar Singh Thapa)

Second influential family of Bagale Thapa clan; the other being Thapa dynasty.

 Bagh Bhim Singh Thapa (Umrao)
 Kaji Amar Singh Thapa (Bada)
 Kaji Ranadhoj Thapa
 Kaji Ripumardan Thapa
 Kaji Badal Singh Thapa
 Bhaktabir Thapa
 Narsingh Thapa
 Ramdas Thapa
 Kaji Ranajor Singh Thapa 
 Arjun Singh Thapa
 Bhupal Singh Thapa

Connected Members

Jharana Thapa, wife of eighth descendant of Bada Kaji

Chautariya family (Chandrarup Shah)
Chautariyas are non-throne lineage descendants of Shah dynasty.

King Prithvipati Shah of Gorkha Kingdom
 Adhirajakumar Chandrarup Shah of Gorkha Kingdom
 Vishnurup Shah
 Kaji Jiva Shah
 Chautariya Prana Shah
 Mukhtiyar Chautariya Fatya Jung Shah
 Mukhtiyar Chautariya Pushkar Shah
 Birbaha Shah
 Chautariya Bam Shah
 Chautariya Hasti Dal Shah

Thapa family (Bhakti Thapa)
Bhakti Thapa, Nepalese Sardar
Arjun Bahadur Thapa, eighth descendant of Bhakti Thapa

Rana family

Bal Narsingh Kunwar
Bhaktabir Kunwar
Jung Bahadur Kunwar Rana
Jagat Jang Rana
Bam Bahadur Kunwar
Badri Narsingh Kunwar
Jaya Bahadur Kunwar
Krishna Bahadur Kunwar
Ranodip Singh Kunwar
Jagat Shamsher Kunwar
Dhir Shamsher Kunwar Rana
Bir Shamsher Jang Bahadur Rana
Khadga Shamsher Jang Bahadur Rana
Rana Shamsher Jang Bahadur Rana
Dev Shamsher Jang Bahadur Rana
Chandra Shamsher Jang Bahadur Rana
Mohan Shamsher Jang Bahadur Rana
Bijay Shamsher Jang Bahadur Rana
Pashupati Shamsher Jang Bahadur Rana
Devyani Rana
Baber Shamsher Jang Bahadur Rana
Udaya Shumsher Rana, great-grandson of Baber
Kaiser Shamsher Jang Bahadur Rana
Bhim Shamsher Jang Bahadur Rana
Padma Shamsher Jang Bahadur Rana
Subarna Shamsher Rana
Juddha Shamsher Jang Bahadur Rana
Kiran Shamsher Rana

Other notable connected members

Nain Singh Thapa was father-in-law of Bal Narsingh Kunwar.
Ranajit Pande, maternal grandfather of Ganesh Kumari, mother of Jung Bahadur Rana
George Jivaji Rao Scindia, father-in-law of Pashupati Shamsher Jang Bahadur Rana.
Sunil Bahadur Thapa, son-in-law of Himalaya Shamsher JBR
Prithvi Bahadur Pande, son-in-law of Himalaya Shamsher JBR

Koirala family

 Krishna Prasad Koirala (father of 3 ex PMs of Nepal: Matrika, BP & Girija)
 Matrika Prasad Koirala ex. prime minister
 Bishweshwar Prasad Koirala ex. prime minister
 Prakash Koirala royalist politician, son of BP
 Manisha Koirala Bollywood actress, grand daughter of BP
 Siddharth Koirala Bollywood actor, grandson of BP
 Dr. Shashanka Koirala politician, Son of BP
Keshav Prasad Koirala
Dr. Shekhar Koirala, nephew of BP
Tarini Prasad Koirala, journalist
 Girija Prasad Koirala ex. prime minister
 Sujata Koirala ex. deputy prime minister, daughter of GP

Other notable connected members

 Sushil Koirala (ex PM & ex. president of Nepali congress) (Cousin of Matrika, BP & Girija from Mother side) 
Shailaja Acharya, former deputy PM of Nepal
 Mahesh Acharya ex. minister, Nephew of BP
Amod Prasad Upadhyay, ex minister, nephew

Nidhi family 
 Mahendra Narayan Nidhi, (Gandhian leader, a founding leader of Nepali congress, first deputy-speaker of First legislature Parliament, former Water Resource and Local Development)
 Bimalendra Nidhi, ex. deputy PM and Home minister of Nepal, vice-president of NC(Son of Mahendra Narayan Nidhi)
 Ninu Kumari Karn, Madhesh-based politician of Nepali Congress (Niece of Bimalendra Nidhi)

Mishra family 
List ordered chronologically
 Bhadrakali Mishra, several ministerial portfolios, including Minister of Transport in joint Rana-Congress cabinet, 1951
 Ram Narayan Mishra, former Industry minister in B.P. Koirala cabinet, 1959
 Hari Shankar Mishra, Governor of Province no 2 since August 2021 (Son of Ram Narayan Mishra)

Bhandari family
Madan Bhandari, Former CPN-UML general secretary
Bidhya Devi Bhandari, wife of Madan, President of Nepal

Bhattarai-Yami family
 Dharma Ratna Yami freedom fighter, father of Hisila yami
 Baburam Bhattarai ex. prime minister
 Hisila Yami ex. minister, wife of Baburam

Deuba - Rana family
 Sher Bahadur Deuba Ex. Prime minister
 Arzu Rana Deuba Wife of Sher Bahadur Deuba

K.C.-Thapa family
 Arjun Narasingha K.C., Former Minister of Health, Education & Urban Development
Gagan Thapa, Current Member of Parliament, General Secretary of the Nepali Congress, and Former Minister of Health, son-in-law of Arjun Narasingha
Jagadiswor Narasingha K.C., Former Member of the 1st and 2nd Constituent Assembly. Former President of Nepali Congress Nuwakot, younger brother of Arjun Narasingha
 Ganesh Pandit, Former Member of Parliament (CPN-UML), Nuwakot-1 1991, uncle of Arjun Narasingha
Kedar Narasingha K.C., Former President of the Nepal Medical Council and Former Director of the National Tuberculosis Center.
Late Ramjee Kunwar, Senior Vice President of NTUCII and executive member of Nepali Congress Party. He was also the former vice president and secretary of NTUCI and was acting president.He was a candidate for mayor in local election of 2016.

Mahat family
Dr. Ram Saran Mahat, Ex Finance Minister
Prakash Sharan Mahat, Ex Foreign/Defence Minister, younger brother of Ram Saran

Singh family
Ganesh Man Singh a founding leader Nepali Congress
Prakash Man Singh Ex deputy PM of Nepal

Thapa family (Kamal Thapa)
 Kamal Thapa ex minister, royalist 
 Ganesh Thapa ex president of All Nepal Football Association (ANFA), Member of Constituent Assembly, brother of Kamal Thapa

Thapa family (Surya Bahadur Thapa)
 Surya Bahadur Thapa ex prime minister   
 Sunil Bahadur Thapa member of constituent assembly, son of Surya B.

References

See also
Political families of India
List of political families

Clans
Nepal
Political
Clans
Clans,Political